Elvis Country (I'm 10,000 Years Old) is the thirteenth studio album by American singer and musician Elvis Presley, released on RCA Records (LSP 4460) in January 1971.  Recorded at RCA Studio B in Nashville, it reached number 12 on the Billboard 200.  It peaked at number six in the United Kingdom, selling over one million copies worldwide. It was certified Gold on December 1, 1977 by the Recording Industry Association of America.

The lead single of the album, "I Really Don't Want to Know" backed with "There Goes My Everything", was released on December 8, 1970 and peaked at number 21 on the Billboard Hot 100, number two on the Adult Contemporary chart, and number 23 on the country singles chart.

Content
The bulk of the album came from five days of recording sessions in June 1970 which yielded 35 usable tracks. Presley performed every track "live", recording his vocal part in the same take as the band, as was standard practice for him. Eight tracks from the session were released two months earlier in November 1970 on the That's the Way It Is album. During the sessions, Presley and producer Felton Jarvis realized they had several country songs in hand and decided to record several more to create a full album of country material. Needing two more satisfactory tracks, Elvis returned to the same studio in September where he recorded "Snowbird" and a manic, one-take version of "Whole Lotta Shakin' Goin' On."

Nearly every style of country music is represented: bluegrass, honky tonk, Western swing, rockabilly, countrypolitan, and even the then-nascent "outlaw" movement. Snippets of the song "I Was Born About Ten Thousand Years Ago" act as a bridge between each track.

After this album, Presley would return to his usual practice of recording a seemingly random batch of songs on each trip to the recording studio, letting his producer assemble them into albums.

Reissues
The June 14, 2004, compact disc reissue included six bonus tracks from the same sessions. Three of them had been previously released on the LP Love Letters from Elvis. The others were the B-side "Where Did They Go, Lord?" (a track that made its first LP appearance on the 1978 compilation "He Walks Beside Me"), and the unabridged version of "I Was Born About Ten Thousand Years Ago" later released on Elvis Now.

In 2008 Elvis Country was reissued on the Follow That Dream label in a special two-disc edition that contained the original album tracks along with numerous alternate takes. In late 2011, RCA Legacy (owned by Sony) announced a two-CD "Legacy Edition" set of the Elvis Country album. Enthusiasm was short-lived as fans quickly criticized the decision to pair the album with the leftover set that was 1970's Love Letters LP instead of compiling rarities from the acclaimed Elvis Country set. However, both albums originated from the same recording sessions. An unreleased Quadraphonic version is also known to exist.

Track listing

Original release

2000 reissue bonus tracks

2012 legacy edition reissue

Personnel

Sourced from Keith Flynn.

 Elvis Presley – lead vocals, acoustic rhythm guitar on "I Was Born About Ten Thousand Years Ago" and "Little Cabin on the Hill", harmony vocals on "Snowbird" and "There Goes My Everything"
 James Burton – lead guitar, dobro
 Chip Young – acoustic rhythm guitar
 Eddie Hinton – lead guitar on "Snowbird" and "Whole Lotta Shakin' Goin' On"
 David Briggs – piano, organ on "Little Cabin on the Hill" and "I Washed My Hands in Muddy Water"
 Norbert Putnam – bass
 Jerry Carrigan – drums
 Charlie McCoy – harmonica, organ, vibraphone on "I Really Don't Want to Know"
 Charlie Hodge – acoustic rhythm guitar except "Snowbird" and "Whole Lotta Shakin’ Goin’ On"
Overdubbed

 Farrell Morris – percussion and timpani on "Snowbird", "Funny How Time Slips Away", "Make the World Go Away", "I Really Don't Want To Know", "Faded Love" and "Tomorrow Never Comes"
 Harold Bradley – electric sitar on "Snowbird"
 Weldon Myrick – pedal steel guitar on "Little Cabin on the Hill"
 Bobby Thompson – banjo (on "Little Cabin on the Hill")
 Buddy Spicher – fiddle (on "Little Cabin on the Hill")
 The Imperials Quartet – backing vocals
 The Jordanaires – backing vocals (on "Funny How Time Slips Away", "There Goes My Everything" and "Make The World Go Away")
 Joe Babcock – backing vocals
 Millie Kirkham – backing vocals
 Mary Holladay – backing vocals
 Ginger Holladay – backing vocals
 June Page – backing vocals
 Sonja Montgomery – backing vocals
 Dolores Edgin – backing vocals
 Mary Greene – backing vocals
 Temple Riser – backing vocals
 Cam Mullins – string arrangements
 Don Tweedy – string arrangements
 Bergen White – horn arrangements

Production staff
 Felton Jarvis – producer

References

External links

1971 albums
Elvis Presley albums
Albums produced by Felton Jarvis
RCA Records albums